Maryada may refer to:

 Maryada (1950 film), a Bengali drama film
 Maryada (1971 film), a Hindi film
 Maryada... of an Indian family, a Hindi TV serial on TV Asia
 Maryada: Lekin Kab Tak?, a Hindi TV serial on STAR Plus
 Sikh Rehat Maryada, the Sikh code of conduct